Joué-lès-Tours Football Club Touraine is a French association football club founded in 2008 as the result of a merger between US Joué-lès-Tours and ASC Joué Touraine. It is based in the town of Joué-lès-Tours, Indre-et-Loire and its home stadium is the Stade Jean Bouin. As of the 2009–10 season, the club plays in the Division d'Honneur de Centre, the sixth tier of French football.

External links
Joué-lès-Tours FCT club information 

Football clubs in France
Association football clubs established in 2008
2008 establishments in France
Sport in Indre-et-Loire
Football clubs in Centre-Val de Loire